Carlos Maximiliano Pimenta de Laet  (October 3, 1847 – December 7, 1927) was a journalist, professor and poet from Brazil.

References

1847 births
1927 deaths
Brazilian journalists
Male journalists
Members of the Brazilian Academy of Letters
People from Rio de Janeiro (city)